Ojo may refer to:

Ōjō, a Japanese Buddhist term referring to rebirth in the Pure Land of Amitabha Buddha
Ojo, a  curious red bear cub who has a wild imagination and is good friends with Treelo on Bear in the Big Blue House
Ojo (comic), a 5-part comic book series by Sam Kieth
Ojo (name) a Yoruba preordained name 
Ojo (surname)
Ojo, Lagos State, a local government area in Lagos State, Nigeria
Ojo the Lucky, an Oz book series character